The Mahindra HyAlfa or Mahindra Hy-Alfa is a hydrogen internal combustion auto rickshaw produced by Mahindra and Mahindra Limited.

Overview
It was first introduced in 2006, and then showcased again at the World Hydrogen Technologies Convention 2009; and again in Delhi Auto Expo 2012.

The development of the hydrogen-powered rickshaw happened with support from the International Centre for Hydrogen Energy Technologies. It was designed and tested by experts at the Indian Institute of Technology Delhi.

The Hy-Alfa is available in both passenger (3–seater) and in cargo versions.

It currently has 15 Hy Alfa auto rickshaws on a trial run at Pragati Maidan in New Delhi.

The rickshaws are not expected to enter commercial markets until 2020.

Issues
According to the Indian Ministry of New and Renewable Energy (MNRE), hydrogen energy is at present only at the Research, Development and Demonstration (RD&D) stage. As a result, the number of hydrogen stations may still be low, although much more are expected to be introduced soon.
To overcome this problem of lack of hydrogen refill stations, (other) hydrogen vehicles may use bi-fuel capability, but the Mahindra HyAlfa is not equipped with this.

References

Mahindra vehicles
Cars of India
Rickshaws
Three-wheeled motor vehicles